Paul Lars Henderson, Jr. (August 8, 1923 – December 10, 2019) was an American film and television actor. He was known for playing Clint Travis in the American western television series 26 Men.

Henderson was born and raised on a ranch in Pueblo, Colorado, and became an expert marksman. He attended Santa Monica High School, graduating in 1942. He then joined the Merchant Marine, training in Navy boot camp and at the United States Merchant Marine Academy before serving until the end of World War II. On being discharged he moved to Santa Monica, California. 

Henderson began his screen career in 1957, appearing in the television series Cheyenne, and adopting the stage name Kelo Henderson. He then co-starred in the western television series 26 Men, playing Clint Travis. 

After the series ended in 1959, Henderson appeared in films and television programs, including Tales of Wells Fargo. Return to Warbow, Sergeant Preston of the Yukon and Saddle the Wind. He also appeared in two films, The Treasure of the Aztecs and The Pyramid of the Sun God, playing Frank Wilson in both of the films. In 2003, he was honored with the Golden Boot Award. 

Henderson died in December 2019 from complications of surgical procedure in Ridgecrest, California, at the age of 96.

Filmography

References

External links 

Rotten Tomatoes profile

1923 births
2019 deaths
People from Pueblo, Colorado
Male actors from Colorado
American male film actors
American male television actors
20th-century American male actors
Western (genre) television actors
Male Western (genre) film actors
Golden Boot Awards recipients